Chetr Borei is a district of Kratié province, Cambodia.

Administration
The district is subdivided into 10 communes (khum).

Communes and villages

References

External links

Kratié province
Districts of Kratié province